The Chicago Herald may refer to the following newspapers:

The Chicago Herald (1881–95), merged with the Chicago Times in 1895 to form the Chicago Times-Herald
The Chicago Record-Herald, its successor, published from 1901 to 1914
The Chicago Herald (1914–18), its successor, known as the Chicago Herald-Examiner from 1918 to 1939
The Chicago Herald-American, its successor from 1939 to 1953
The Daily Herald (Arlington Heights), published since 1871